Johann Carl Friedrich Rellstab (27 February 1759 – 19 August 1813) was a German composer, writer, music publisher, and critic who was born and died in Berlin. Rellstab was a very influential figure in Berlin's musical life.

Career
He performed in student concerts 1768 to 1775 at the Joachimsthal Gymnasium in Berlin. He studied with Johann Friedrich Agricola from 1773 to 1776, and composition with Carl Friedrich Christian Fasch. He planned to continue his education with Carl Philipp Emanuel Bach in Hamburg, when in 1779 he had to take over the printing business of his father. Given his interest in music, Rellstab changed the focus of the business towards music and added a music lending library (in 1783) and a music publishing branch to the firm (ca. 1785). Later on, Rellstab also made instruments and sold other music supplies. After losing his property in the War of the Fourth Coalition in 1806, he began teaching music lessons to children.

Rellstab's compositions include a Te Deum, a mass, numerous cantatas, lieder, and an unperformed singspiel, Die Apotheke, among other works.

His son Ludwig Rellstab was also a music critic and a poet. Rellstab's eldest daughter, Caroline Rellstab (1793–1813), was a singer noted for her extraordinary range extending to F6. She sang at Breslau from 1811, and was particularly well known for her role as the Queen of the Night in Mozart's Die Zauberflöte.

Published works
Source:
 Versuch über die Vereinigung der musikalischen und oratorischen Declamation, hauptsächlich für Musiker und Componisten mit erläuternden Beyspielen (1786)
 Über die Bemerkungen eines Reisenden, die Berlinischen Kirchenmusiken, Concerte, Oper und königliche Kümmermusik betreffend (polemical pamphlet, 1789)
 Anleitung für Clavierspieler, den Gebrauch der Bach'schen Fingersetzung, die Manieren und den Vortrag betreffend (1790)

References

Further reading
Guttmann, Oskar (1885–1943). Johann Karl Friedrich Rellstab. Ein Beitrag zur Musikgeschichte Berlins. Berlin: E. Ebering, 1910.

External links 
 
 Gallica 13 Scores published by Rellstab in facsimile.
 
Johann Carl Friedrich Rellstab's Organ Sonata (Recording mp3)

1759 births
1813 deaths
Musicians from Berlin
Writers from Berlin
German opera composers
Male opera composers
German music publishers (people)
German music critics
Music libraries
German male non-fiction writers
German male classical composers